William Rennie may refer to:
 William Rennie (Victoria Cross) (1822–1887), Scottish recipient of the Victoria Cross
 William Rennie (horticulturist) (1835–1910), scientific farmer and seed merchant in Ontario
 Willie Rennie (William Cowan Rennie, born 1967), Scottish politician
 William J. Rennie (1891–1964), American football and basketball coach
 William Hepburn Rennie, British colonial official in Hong Kong and St. Vincent